is a Japanese football player. He plays for S.League club Geylang International FC.

Career
He is a central defender, who played for Shonan Bellmare for five years, and had loan spells with FC Kariya and Fujieda MYFC.

He first came to Singapore to play in the 2013 S.League season with Albirex Niigata FC (Singapore), appearing in 32 matches and scoring 1 goal in all competitions. It was announced in December 2013 that he, along with teammate - Yuki Ichikawa, have signed for Geylang International for the upcoming season.

He signed for 9 times S.League champions Warriors FC for the 2016 S.League season.

Career statistics

Club

Notes

References

External links

1990 births
Living people
Association football people from Ibaraki Prefecture
Japanese footballers
J2 League players
Japan Football League players
Singapore Premier League players
Shonan Bellmare players
FC Kariya players
Fujieda MYFC players
Albirex Niigata Singapore FC players
Geylang International FC players
Japanese expatriate footballers
Japanese expatriate sportspeople in Singapore
Expatriate footballers in Singapore
Association football central defenders